The 2002 Women's World Open Squash Championship was the women's edition of the 2002 World Open, which serves as the individual world championship for squash players. The event took place in Doha in Qatar from 26 October until 2 November 2002. Sarah Fitzgerald won a record fifth World Open title, defeating Natalie Pohrer in the final.

Seeds

Draw and results

Notes
Natalie Pohrer was formerly Natalie Grainger.

Annelize Naudé switched nationality from South Africa to the Netherlands.

See also
 World Open
 2002 Men's World Open Squash Championship

References

External links
 

2002 in squash
World Squash Championships
Squash tournaments in Qatar
2002 in Qatari sport
2002 in women's squash
International sports competitions hosted by Qatar